The 1959 UCI Track Cycling World Championships were the World Championship for track cycling. They took place in Amsterdam, Netherlands from 8 to 13 August 1959. Eight events were contested, 6 for men (3 for professionals, 3 for amateurs) and 2 for women.

Medal summary

Medal table

See also
 1959 UCI Road World Championships

References

Track cycling
UCI Track Cycling World Championships by year
International cycle races hosted by the Netherlands
1959 in track cycling
August 1959 sports events in Europe
1950s in Amsterdam
Cycling in Amsterdam